FC Brunsviga Braunschweig was a German association football club from the city of Braunschweig, Lower Saxony. The short-lived club was founded in 1896 by students of the local teacher's college and was disbanded sometime in 1901. It is notable as one of the founding members of the German Football Association (Deutscher Fußball Bund or German Football Association) at Leipzig on 28 January 1900.

Throughout its brief existence Brunsviga was a rival to the city's earliest football club, Eintracht Braunschweig. They lost their first match against the senior side 0:12 on 13 February 1898 with the last recorded meeting between the two clubs on 15 April 1900 ending in a 7:2 victory for Eintracht.

Brunsviga limited themselves to recruiting local players, while the more ambitious Eintracht club recruited from across the country and often took on Brunsviga players. Following the disbanding of Brunsviga many of the former members subsequently moved on to join Eintracht.

References
 Hans Dieter Baroth: Als der Fußball laufen lernte. Essen, 1992 
 Kurt Hoffmeister: Zeitreise durch die Braunschweiger Sportgeschichte. Braunschweig, 2001
 1905–1930 – 25 Jahre Norddeutscher Sportverband, Hamburg, 1930
 Stefan Peters: Eintracht Braunschweig – Die Chronik, Kassel, 1998

Football clubs in Germany
Defunct football clubs in Germany
Defunct football clubs in Lower Saxony
Sport in Braunschweig
1896 establishments in Germany
1901 disestablishments in Germany
19th-century establishments in the Duchy of Brunswick
Organisations based in Braunschweig
Association football clubs established in 1896
Association football clubs disestablished in 1901